Nuh-bey Tarkovsky (Kumyk: Таргъулу Нугь-Бек Хан-огълу, 1878–1951) was a descendant of the Kumyk shamkhals, participant of the World War I, military dictator of Dagestan and minister of war of the Mountain Republic.

Biography

Early years 
Nukh Bey was born on May 15, 1878, in the village of Korkmaskala, Temir-Khan-Shurinsky okrug, Dagestan Region. He began his studies at a realschule in Buynaksk. In 1889 he was sent to the Simbirsk Cadet Corps, from which he successfully graduated in 1897. On August 31, 1897, he entered the Nikolaev cavalry school in St. Petersburg as an junker private. June 20, 1899 he promoted to non-commissioned officer. On August 8, after graduating from college in the 1st category, he was promoted to cornets with disvtribution to the Ossetian cavalry division as part of the Caucasian cavalry division. Then he was transferred to the Dagestan cavalry regiment of the 3rd Caucasus Cossack division.

During World war I 
On November 25, 1914, Nuh-bey was appointed commander of the reserve hundred of the 2nd Dagestan cavalry regiment, from December 1, 1914, on the southwestern front, participating in battles. In April 1915 he was approved in the princely rank and in the same year he was presented to the Order of St. Anna IV class with an inscription for bravery.

For a personal feat during the capture of the village of Dobropole, the commander of the Caucasian native cavalry division, major general Dmitry Bagration petitioned for the award of captain Nuh Tarkovsky golden weapon for bravery. In October 1916, as a lieutenant colonel he was sent to the Caucasus to organize replenishment. In 1917–1918 Nuh-bey commanded the Dagestan cavalry regiment of the Caucasian native cavalry division.

Revolution and Civil War 
On March 22, 1917, in Buynaksk Nuh-bey was elected to the Provisional Regional Executive Committee of the "Great Assembly" under the chairmanship of Zubair Temirkhanov. In April he was elected a delegate to the Mountainous Republic of the Northern Caucasus in Vladikavkaz. He entered the Central Committee of the Union of Highlanders, as chairman of the Dagestan section with a seat in Buynaksk and as such worked as part of the Provisional Regional Executive Committee, the head of which since August 1917 was elected chairman of the Regional Land Committee Jalal Korkmasov, leader of the socialist faction.

In November 1918, he transferred his powers to the Mountainous Republic government, whose member Pshemakho Kotsev arrived in Dagestan with Turkish troops. On December 20, he was appointed Minister of War of that government and after the final defeat of the Ottoman Empire in the First World War its detachments left Dagestan, where the troops of General Denikin arrived. Since February 1919, Nuh-bey became the acting head of the Mountainous government and the minister of foreign affairs. On March 9 and 14 of the same year, he protested to the representatives of the Entente, who were in Baku  about the invasion of Anton Denikin's volunteer army into Dagestan, but to no avail and as a result on March 25 he left all his posts. From that moment until March 1920, Nuh-bey Tarkovsky took part in hostilities on the side of the Armed Forces of the south of Russia.

Emigration 
After the defeat of Anton Denikin, Nuh-bey emigrated to Iran where his wife's relatives lived. Despite the audience with Ahmad shah of the Qajar dynasty he did not receive any positions. At the end of 1920, he moved to Turkey, but in connection with the revolutionary events in that country and the establishment of relations with Soviet Russia, he moved to France. Then with the beginning of the World War II he moved to Switzerland and died in Lausanne in 1951.

Family 
His wife Gulruh (also called Gulyusha, born approximately 1882) is from a noble Persian family. They had two daughters and a son, who at the year of his father's death lived in Tehran and worked as an engineer.

Awards 

Order of St. George 4th class
Order of St. Stanislaus 3rd class (1905), swords and a bow to it (1915)
Order of St. Anna 3rd class (1908)
Order of St. Stanislaus 2nd class with swords (1911)
Order of St. Anna 2nd class (1913)
Order of St. Vladimir 4th class with swords and bow (1915)
Order of St. Anna 4th class with the inscription "For bravery" (1915)
Golden Weapon for Bravery (1915)

See also 

 Abdul-bey Tabasaransky
 Shamkhalate of Tarki
 Mountainous Republic

References

External links 

 Kuznetsov B. M. "1918 год в Дагестане – 1918 in Dagestan"
 "Officers Dagestanis - Nuh-bey Tarkovsky" - gazavat.ru
 Полковник князь Нуй-бек Шамхал Тарковский. Вехи судьбы – Colonel prince Nuh-bey shamkhal Tarkovsky, yoldash.ru

1878 births
1951 deaths
Recipients of the Order of St. Anna, 2nd class
Recipients of the Order of St. Anna, 3rd class
Russian people of World War I
Recipients of the Order of St. George of the Fourth Degree
Recipients of the Order of St. Vladimir, 4th class
Recipients of the Order of St. Anna, 4th class
Recipients of the Order of Saint Stanislaus (Russian)
Kumyks